Guioa myriadenia is a species of plant in the family Sapindaceae. It is endemic to the Philippines.

References

molliuscula
Endemic flora of the Philippines
Endangered flora of Asia
Taxonomy articles created by Polbot